Richard Arnold Epstein (born March 5, 1927 in Los Angeles, California), also known under the pseudonym E. P. Stein, is an American game theorist.

Education
He obtained his A.B. degree from UCLA in 1948. He then studied at the University of California Berkeley. He received his doctorate in physics, on the Born formalization of isochromatic lines, in 1961, from the University of Barcelona.

Career
He then shifted from spectroscopy to space communications, and worked for eighteen years as an electronics and communications engineer for various U.S. space and missile programs. He was variously employed by Parsons-Aerojet Company at Cape Canaveral, Glenn L. Martin Company, TRW Space Technology Laboratories, the Jet Propulsion Laboratory, and Hughes Aircraft Space Systems Division. Epstein has numerous technical publications in the areas of probability theory, statistics, game theory, and space communications. In 1956, he was made a member of the IEEE.

Achievements
The Theory of Gambling and Statistical Logic ranks as the most popular of Epstein's technical books. He served as a consultant to public and private gambling casinos in Greece and Macao, and has testified on technical aspects of gambling in several court cases.

Under the pseudonym "E. P. Stein", he authored various popular works of fiction as well as historic and non-fictional books, and writes for TV and motion pictures.

Books by Epstein
 Richard A. Epstein, The Theory of Gambling and Statistical Logic (revised edition), Academic Press, 1995, . (Second edition), Academic Press, 2009, .

Selected journal publications by Epstein
 Richard A. Epstein, "An automatic synchronization technique," IEEE Transactions on Communication Technology, Vol. 13(4), pp. 547–550, 1965.
 Richard A. Epstein, "Relative coverage of large ground antennas," IEEE Transactions on Space Electronics and Telemetry, Vol. 10(1), pp. 31–83, 1964.

Popular works under the pseudonym E. P. Stein 
 Anna K. Brando and E. P. Stein, Brando for Breakfast, Berkley Pub Group, 1980, .
 E. P. Stein, Flight of the Vin Fiz, Arbor House, 1985, .

See also
Subtract a square, a mathematical game invented by Epstein

Notes

References
  P. Green Jr., "Review of 'The Theory of Gambling and Statistical Logic' (Epstein, R. A.; 1967)," IEEE Transactions on Information Theory, Vol. 15(5), pp. 637–638, 1969.
 Richard W. Hamming, "Games of Chance. (Book Reviews: The Theory of Gambling and Statistical Logic)," Science, Vol. 161(3844), pp. 878, 1968.

External links

Richard Arnold Epstein at the MathSciNet

Richard Epstein's Home Page (Archived as of 2013)

21st-century American physicists
Living people
1927 births
University of Barcelona alumni
University of California, Los Angeles alumni
Probability theorists
American expatriates in Spain